Lindon Guscott (born 29 March 1972) is an English former footballer. He made 2 appearances in The Football League for Gillingham.

References

1972 births
English Football League players
Gillingham F.C. players
Living people
Footballers from Lambeth
English footballers
Association football forwards
Place of birth missing (living people)